Zelenika is a village in Tryavna Municipality, in Gabrovo Province, in northern central Bulgaria.

Honours
Zelenika Peak on Brabant Island, Antarctica is named after the village.

References

Villages in Gabrovo Province